Mudukulathur taluk is a taluk of Ramanathapuram district of the Indian state of Tamil Nadu. The headquarters of the taluk is the town of Mudukulathur.

Demographics
According to the 2011 census, the taluk of Mudukulathur had a population of 113,361 with 56,464  males and 56,897 females. There were 1008 women for every 1000 men. It has a large number of Appanad Maravars along with Yadav. The taluk had a literacy rate of 68. Child population in the age group below 6 was 5,253 Males and 5,217 Females.

References 

Taluks of Ramanathapuram district